The second Karnali Provincial Assembly was elected by the 2022 provincial elections on 20 November 2022. 40 members were elected to the assembly, 24 of whom were elected through direct elections and 16 of whom were elected through the party list proportional representation system. The first session of the assembly commenced from 2 January 2023.

Leaders

Officers 

 Speaker of the Assembly: Hon. Nanda Gurung (CPN (UML))
 Deputy Speaker of the Assembly: Hon. Yashoda Neupane (CPN (Maoist Centre))
 Leader of the House (Chief Minister): Hon. Raj Kumar Sharma (CPN (Maoist Centre))
 Leader of the Opposition: Hon. Jeevan Bahadur Shahi (Nepali Congress)

Parliamentary party 

 Parliamentary party leader of Nepali Congress: Hon. Jeevan Bahadur Shahi
 Parliamentary party leader of CPN (Maoist Centre): Hon. Raj Kumar Sharma
 Parliamentary party leader of CPN (UML): Hon. Yam Lal Kandel

Composition

Members

References

External links 

 समानुपातिक निर्वाचन प्रणाली तर्फको कर्णाली प्रदेश सभामा निर्वाचित सदस्यहरुको विवरण

Members of the Provincial Assembly of Karnali Province